Wulff Castle is a historic castle overlooking the sea in Viña del Mar, Chile. It was built in 1906 for the Wulff family. It is the headquarters of the city heritage center.

History
Gustavo Adolfo Wulff Mowle, German saltpeter and coal trader, as well as maritime transporter, migrated to Chile in 1881. In 1904, he bought from Dr. Teodoro Von Schoeders  in front of Cerro Castillo (Castle Hill), in Viña del Mar. He built the new house in 1906. By 1917, Wulff hired architect Alberto Cruz Montt to make the house into a castle. Eventually a new tower was added built upon some rocks on the northern side of the castle, and a bridge joined them together.

In 1946, Mrs. Esperanza Artaza Matta inherited the property, and asked another architect, José Alcalde, to remodel it. The southern tower was removed.

The City bought the castle in 1959. From 1960 until 1988, it housed the Museo Naval de la Armada de Chile (Chilean Navy Forces Museum). Between 1990 and 1999, it lodged the collection of the writer Salvador Reyes Figueroa. In 1995, it was pronounced a National Historical Monument by Chilean Law.

References

Castles in Chile
Gothic Revival architecture in Chile
Houses completed in 1917
Houses in Chile
Buildings and structures in Valparaíso Region
Tourist attractions in Valparaíso Region
1906 establishments in Chile
Coasts of Valparaíso Region
German-Chilean_architecture